Cerion politum is a species of Caribbean land snail, a mollusk in the family Cerionidae, which is found only in Maisí in the Guantánamo Province of Cuba. It was discovered by Charles Johnson Maynard and cited by him in 1896.

References

Cerionidae
Gastropods described in 1896
Endemic fauna of Cuba